The Czech League of American Football (ČLAF) is a national american football competition in the Czech Republic. First held in 1994, it is organized by the Czech American Football Association (ČAAF).

Seasonal structure

Divisions
Next to the "Paddock League" which is the first Division in Czech American Football there is in 2019; 5 more Divisions in Men's and 1 Division in Ladies' Football.
The Trnava Bulldogs (from Trnava in Slovakia) are the only non-Czech participant in 2019.

Format

Regular season
Divisions 1 and 2 uses a round-robin tournament system. Similar to Divisions 1 and 2, Division 3 also uses a same round-robin tournament system.

Playoffs
A semifinal bracket as follows 1. vs 4. and 2. vs 3., deciding the semifinals winners advanced into the finals. Whoever wins the semifinals, the team must advanced into the championship game, the Czech Bowl. Divisions 2 and 3 also has the final game, the Silver Bowl and the Bronze Bowl respectively, while Division 4 has the same championship game, the Iron Bowl, as the ČAAF does that.

Other information
In ČLAF A, a team must have 12 minutes, 10 minutes in ČLAF B and 4x8 minutes in ČLAF C. All games use the International Federation of American Football rule book.

ČLAF winners

Czech Bowl winners
The Czech Bowl is the national American football game of the Czech Republic, where it had been held since 1995 after the Prague Panthers won the regular season championship when it swept the said season in 1994, the year the Czech Bowl was not held.

Czech Bowl statistics

Silver Bowl titleholders

Bronze Bowl titleholders

Iron Bowl titleholders

Rose Bowl titleholders (female)

References

External links
 Czech American Football Association

Amer
Spa
Sports leagues established in 1994
1994 establishments in the Czech Republic
American Football
Professional sports leagues in the Czech Republic